Rango is an American Western situation comedy starring comedian Tim Conway, which was broadcast in the United States on the ABC television network in 1967 and lasted 17 episodes.

Synopsis
Rango is an inept, bumbling Texas Ranger in the Old West who has been assigned to the supply room at the quietest post the Rangers have, Deep Wells Ranger Station, so as to keep him from creating unnecessary trouble. He seems to bring his own trouble with him, however, as after his arrival, crime suddenly returns to the Deep Wells area, a place that had seen very little of it during the previous 20 years.

Rango's assistant in the supply room is Pink Cloud, an overly assimilated American Indian who is very fond of the ways of the white people and prefers reading a book in a comfortable bed to living the traditional life of a Plains Indian. Pink Cloud's command of the English language is generally better than those of the white people around him; for example, in one episode, he says, "Rango say him return when sun high over teepee.  By that, I presume he meant that he would be back by noon."

Also at the Deep Wells Ranger Station is Captain Horton, Rango's long-suffering company commander. Horton wants to transfer Rango out of Deep Wells, but cannot because Rango's father is the head of the Texas Rangers.

Cast
Tim Conway...Rango
Guy Marks...Pink Cloud
Norman Alden...Captain Horton

Production
Tim Conway previously had starred in McHale's Navy from 1962 to 1966 and in two theatrical films spun off from the series, McHale's Navy in 1964 and McHale's Navy Joins the Air Force in 1965. Rango was the first of several unsuccessful attempts at giving Conway a starring role in a situation comedy of his own.

Rango′s theme song, "Rango", was co-written by Earle Hagen and Ben Raleigh and sung by Frankie Laine.

Reception
TV Guide ranked the series number 47 on its "TV Guide′s 50 Worst Shows of All Time" list in 2002.

Broadcast history
Rango premiered on ABC on January 13, 1967. It lasted only half a season, and its 17th and final new episode aired on May 5, 1967. Reruns of Rango then aired during its regular time slot until September 1, 1967. The show was broadcast at 9:00 pm on Friday throughout its run.

Episodes
SOURCES trakt.tv Rango: Season 1 1x01 Rango the Outlaw Accessed 26 November 2021Rango: Season 1 1x11 Shootout at Mesa Flats Accessed 26 November 2021

References

External links
 
Rango opening credits on YouTube
Promotional spot for Rango on YouTube
Stars of Rango interviewed on American Bandstand in 1967 on YouTube

American Broadcasting Company original programming
English-language television shows
1960s American sitcoms
1967 American television series debuts
1967 American television series endings
Television series about the Texas Ranger Division
Television series by CBS Studios
1960s Western (genre) television series
Fictional characters of the Texas Ranger Division